The Perfect Man is a 2005 American romantic comedy film directed by Mark Rosman and written by Gina Wendkos. It stars Hilary Duff, Heather Locklear, Chris Noth and Ben Feldman. Shooting for the film began in May 2004.

Teenager Holly Hamilton (Duff) is tired of moving every time her single mom Jean (Locklear) ends a bad relationship. To prevent her mother from making another bad decision, Holly has an idea: create a secret admirer who is the perfect man. However, things spin out of control and Holly has to improvise.

Plot
Single mother Jean relocates every time she gets her heart broken, much to her teenage daughter Holly's dismay. Holly devises a plan to invent a secret admirer for her, so she will be happy and not need to relocate again.

Overhearing her friend Amy's uncle Ben ordering flowers for a woman, Holly uses his advice on women (which she gets by telling him she needs help for a school project on romance), sending her mother orchids, other gifts and love notes, and is soon communicating with her mother as a fictitious admirer (who Holly names Ben) via the Internet.

As her mother becomes more interested, Holly has to find a photo of this admirer. She sends one of the real Ben, and then devises the reason why they cannot meet in person: he is working in China.

While she is developing the online romance between her mother and fake Ben, and preventing her mother and the real Ben from meeting in person, she finds herself drawn to a cute, artistic boy in her class, Adam, but is unwilling to get close to anyone as she is uprooted so often, to not have to say goodbye.

As the charade continues, and as Holly spends more time with Ben while picking his brain for romance tips, she slowly begins to see qualities in him which make her believe he really is her mother's "perfect man". Holly asks for Adam's help to disguise himself as Ben on the telephone to break up with Jean. But he fails, as he is revealed to be harboring feelings for Holly as well, in effect telling Holly's mother the opposite of what was planned.

The following day at school, Holly confronts Adam angrily because of his failed attempt to break up with her mother over the phone disguised as Ben. He apologizes, telling her that he just got distracted. Holly demands to know what he could have possibly been distracted by, and Adam admits his feelings for her by kissing her.

That night, Lenny, a man infatuated with Jean, proposes to her, and she replies with a "maybe". Holly, in an act of desperation, then disguises herself as Ben's secretary and arranges a meeting between Ben and her mother. The next day, when Holly mistakenly thinks he is marrying someone else. She disrupts the wedding to tell Ben he should be with her mother, not knowing he was there as the bride's dear friend, and was catering the wedding.

A disappointed Ben follows Holly out, and she admits the full story. She then goes to the meeting place and confesses the whole ruse to Jean, who seems to take it terribly. Days pass, and Holly and her mother keep distant. Holly is offended by her interpretation of Adam's drawing of "Princess Holly". 

Holly begs Jean for them to move again, but her humiliated mother wants to stay. Holly asks her to leave this time for her, as she always has to move for her mother. Jean cannot argue with that, so they start to pack. Adam, for what he thinks is the last time, goes to Holly's, giving her mother his drawing. He comments that the drawing has another side that Holly did not see before she left. It is of Adam telling Holly that he will always be there for her.

Touched, Jean logs onto the Internet using Holly's screen name and talks to Adam. He, thinking it is Holly, says that her mom sets a bad example by getting up and leaving when things get bad. This, in return, is creating a bad role model for her own daughters. Jean is deeply moved by this and decides to stay, finding a new job and trying to rebuild her life without running away. She also apologizes to her daughter, telling her to look at the other side of the drawing, making Holly happy.

Meanwhile, Ben is inspired by what Holly told him about her mother, and with her help, Jean and Ben finally meet and Jean finds her "perfect man" at last. Holly is on the road to her perfect man as well. As she has some stability in her life, she finally opens up and admits her feelings for Adam. At the end, Adam and Holly go to their first school dance together.

Cast
 Hilary Duff as Holly Hamilton, a girl who hates moving to another city every time her mother ends a relationship and create a "perfect man" through fake letters to force Jean not to break her heart with another real man.
 Heather Locklear as Jean Hamilton, Holly's mother, a single baker desperately seeking love, who relocates every time she gets her heart broken by another man.
 Chris Noth as Ben Cooper, Amy's uncle, owner of the River Bistro, and Holly's inspiration for the perfect man she creates for her mother.
 Ben Feldman as Adam Forrest, one of Holly's classmates and friends. Adam has a crush on Holly.
 Vanessa Lengies as Amy Pearl, Holly's classmate and best friend.
 Mike O'Malley as Lenny Horton, employee at the bakery where Jean works.
 Caroline Rhea as Gloria, Jean's friend and co-worker.
 Aria Wallace as Zoe Hamilton, Holly's seven-year-old sister.
 Carson Kressley as Lance, one of Ben's employees, a gay man also looking for love.
 Kym Whitley as Dolores, Jean's friend and employer.
 Michelle Nolden as Amber

Production
Shooting for the film began in May 2004 and was based on screenwriter Heather Robinson's life in Tucson, Arizona, and ended the following July. Carson Kressley missed two days of shooting on his reality makeover show, Queer Eye, due to filming on The Perfect Man overrunning. Queer Eye explained his absence by claiming the fashion expert was busy shopping. On the weekends, Duff was busy recording songs for her then-upcoming self-titled album.

Reception 
Rotten Tomatoes reports an approval rating of 6% based on 129 reviews, with an average rating of 3.4/10. The website's critics consensus reads: "Preposterous and predictable, The Perfect Man manages few laughs with its poorly paced sitcom script, cookie-cutter characters and contrived plotting."  Metacritic assigned the film a weighted average score of 27 out of 100, based on 29 critics, indicating "generally unfavorable reviews". Audiences polled by CinemaScore gave the film an average grade of "B+" on an A+ to F scale.

Box office
In its opening weekend, the film grossed $5,300,980 million in 2,087 theaters in the United States and Canada, ranking number eight at the box office, the best debut for a teen comedy film that week. By the end of its run, The Perfect Man grossed $16,535,005 domestically and $3,235,470 internationally, totaling $19,770,475 worldwide.

Soundtrack

The Perfect Man (Original Motion Picture Soundtrack) is the soundtrack album to the film of the same name, released on June 14, 2005, by independent label Curb Records.

Track listing

Awards and nominations 
2007 Teen Choice Awards
 Best Actress Comedy (Hilary Duff) - (The Perfect Man & Cheaper By The Dozen 2)
 Lost to Rachel McAdams - (The Family Stone & Wedding Crashers)

2005 Golden Raspberry Awards
 Worst Actress - Nomination - (Hilary Duff) - (The Perfect Man & Cheaper By The Dozen 2)
 Lost to Jenny McCarthy - Dirty Love

References

External links
 
 
 

2005 romantic comedy films
2000s teen comedy films
2000s teen romance films
2005 films
American romantic comedy films
American teen comedy films
American teen romance films
Films directed by Mark Rosman
Films scored by Christophe Beck
Films produced by Marc E. Platt
Films set in New York City
Films shot in New York City
Films shot in Toronto
Films about mother–daughter relationships
Universal Pictures films
2000s English-language films
2000s American films